[[File:The Trail of Blood.jpg|thumb|400px|Timeline from The Trail of Blood]]The Trail of Blood''' is a 1931 book by  American Southern Baptist minister James Milton Carroll, comprising a collection of five lectures he gave on the history of Baptist churches, which he presented as a succession from  the first Christians. The work has been criticized for linking together numerous unrelated sects and historical  heresies that have no relation to Baptist theology or polity.

Content

The full title is The Trail of Blood: Following the Christians Down through the Centuries: or, The History of Baptist Churches from the Time of Christ, Their Founder, to the Present Day. Carroll presents modern Baptists as the direct successors of a strain of Christianity dating to  apostolic times, reflecting a Landmarkist view first promoted in the mid-nineteenth century by James Robinson Graves (1820-1893).  Graves had started an influential movement in Tennessee and the western states. The Landmark controversy divided many Baptists, and ultimately led to the formation of the American Baptist Association in 1924, as well as of Gospel Missions and unaffiliated churches.  This is a belief called Baptist successionism.

Carroll claims that modern Baptists descend from such earlier groups as:

 the Waldensians (founded in the 1170s, based in the Cottian Alps)
 the Novatianists (or Cathari) (founded in the 3rd century)
 the  Paulicians (founded  650 in Armenia)
 the Donatists (originating in North Africa in the 4th century)

Carroll acknowledges a number of other writers, including G.H. Orchard (1796–1861) and John T. Christian (1854-1925). The title is taken from James Robinson Graves' The Trilemma. The book was published in the year Carroll died. 

James Edward McGoldrick wrote a response to Carroll's work called Baptist Successionism'' which gave researched opposition to the theory of "Baptist successionism."

 Ashland Avenue Baptist Church in Lexington, Kentucky held the copyright to Carroll's book.

See also
 Landmarkism
 Baptist Successionism
 Apostolic Succession

References

External links
Trail of Blood, Challenge Press is one of the sole distributors of the print copy this book
The Trail of Blood at archive.org

Pamphlets
Pseudohistory
1931 non-fiction books
Landmarkism